Julian Winn from Abergavenny, Wales (born 23 September 1972) is a former Welsh competitive cyclist who was formerly directeur sportif at the UCI Continental cycling team Endura Racing. He represented Wales in the 1998 Commonwealth Games at Kuala Lumpur and at the 2002 Commonwealth Games in Manchester. He was appointed Welsh Cycling coach in 2005. In 2008, he was GB road race team manager at the Beijing Olympics, overseeing the victory of Welsh compatriot Nicole Cooke. Since the folding of Team Endura Winn has been director of Sugar Loaf Road, which organises bike riding weekends in the Black Mountains.

Results

Cyclo Cross

2005
1st, Welsh Cyclo Cross Championships  
2006
1st, Welsh Cyclo Cross Championships
2007
1st, Welsh Cyclo Cross Championships

Road

1998 PDM Sports WCU Team
1st, King of the Mountains Tour of Lancs
1st, King of the Mountains Tour of Morocco
1st, Stage 4 Prutour Chester – Nottingham 153.69 km
1st, Welsh National Road Championships
4th, King of the Mountains, Prutour  
1999
3rd, Archer Grand Prix
2000
1st King of the Mountains, Commonwealth Bank Classic, Australia
3rd, Premier Calendar Series Overall GC
2002
1st,  National Road Race Championships
1st, King of the Mountains, 2005 Tour of Britain
3rd, Premier Calendar Series Overall GC

Track

1999
1st, 4000m Team Pursuit National Track Championships

References
 Race results on britishcycling.org.uk

1972 births
Living people
Welsh male cyclists
Welsh track cyclists
Olympic cyclists of Great Britain
Cyclists at the 2004 Summer Olympics
Commonwealth Games competitors for Wales
Cyclists at the 1998 Commonwealth Games
Cyclists at the 2002 Commonwealth Games
British cycling road race champions
Sportspeople from Abergavenny
Welsh cycling coaches
Rás Tailteann winners